Husavik Power Station is a geothermal power station in Húsavík, Iceland. It has a rated capacity of 2 MW. The plant was built by Mannvit Engineering in cooperation with Exorka International. It uses the Kalina power cycle technology and was commissioned in 2000.

References

Geothermal power stations in Iceland